Peter Burgstaller (13 February 1964 – 23 November 2007) was an Austrian football goalkeeper.

Club career
He played for Favoritner AC (until 1984), Wacker Innsbruck (1984–1986), Grazer AK (1986–1987), VfB Mödling (1987–1988), Austria Salzburg (1988–1991), SV Ried (1991–1992) and finally a second spell at Austria Salzburg before retiring from the game in 1993.

Retirement
After retiring from the game, Burgstaller coached lower division side FC Puch during the 1995–96 season, and later founded an event agency in Salzburg.

Death
Burgstaller was shot and killed on a golf course in Durban, South Africa on 23 November 2007. Police suspect the murder was the result of a robbery, as Burgstaller's mobile phone and golfing equipment were missing at the scene of the crime. At the time of his murder, delegates were attending the World Cup qualifying draw in nearby Durban, South Africa.

Three men were arrested after the murder. On 30 October 2009 two of the arrested men were convicted of murder and of robbery with aggravating circumstances.  They received lengthy prison sentences.

References

External links
 Obituary - Austria Salzburg

1964 births
2007 deaths
People from Vöcklabruck District
Austrian footballers
FC Wacker Innsbruck players
Grazer AK players
FC Admira Wacker Mödling players
FC Red Bull Salzburg players
SV Ried players
Austrian Football Bundesliga players
Male murder victims
Deaths by firearm in South Africa
Austrian people murdered abroad
People murdered in South Africa
2007 murders in South Africa
Association football goalkeepers
Footballers from Upper Austria